Don't is a 1925 American silent comedy film directed by Alfred J. Goulding, starring Sally O'Neil, John Patrick, Bert Roach, and Ethel Wales, and released by Metro-Goldwyn-Mayer. The film is one of the B pictures the studio produced to keep the Loews circuit and other cinemas supplied.

The screenplay by Agnes Christine Johnston is based on the story "Don't You Care!" by Rupert Hughes. This film is considered to be a lost film.

Synopsis
Tracey Moffat (Sally O'Neil) is a parent-defying flapper.

Cast

See also
List of lost films

References

External links

Arne Andersen's Lost Film Files

1925 films
Lost American films
Metro-Goldwyn-Mayer films
American silent feature films
1925 comedy films
American black-and-white films
Films based on works by Rupert Hughes
Films directed by Alfred J. Goulding
Silent American comedy films
1925 lost films
Lost comedy films
Flappers
1920s American films